The Australia cricket team toured Bangladesh in August 2021 to play five Twenty20 International (T20I) matches. The matches were used as preparation ahead of the 2021 ICC Men's T20 World Cup. Cricket Australia planned for the series to take place following their tour of the West Indies. It was the first bilateral T20I series between the two teams, and Australia's first tour of Bangladesh since 2017.

Bangladesh won the first T20I match by 23 runs, recording their first ever win in the format against Australia in five attempts. Bangladesh then won the second T20I by five wickets, and the third T20I by ten runs. Therefore, Bangladesh won the series with two matches to spare, and recorded their first ever series win in any format against Australia. Australia won the fourth T20I by three wickets, to avoid a whitewash. However, they lost the final match by 60 runs, with Bangladesh winning the series 4–1.

Background
Although initially Australia were scheduled to play three T20I matches in October 2021, in April 2021, the Bangladesh Cricket Board (BCB) asked Cricket Australia to play five T20Is instead of three. In May 2021, both cricket boards agreed to play five T20Is in August 2021, following Australia's tour of the West Indies.

To avoid any sort of security or health risks, Cricket Australia requested three conditions of the BCB. Firstly they wanted the Australian players and staff to be taken to the team hotel from the Shahjalal International Airport immediately upon arrival, and secondly they wanted only the Australian players, including the individuals concerned to bio-secure bubble, to remain at the hotel. The BCB also wanted to organise the T20I matches in two venues, Mirpur and Chattagram to prevent the pitch from being hampered. However, Cricket Australia have requested that only one venue should be used for the entire series. The BCB later complied with the request, with all five matches scheduled to be played at the Sher-e-Bangla National Cricket Stadium in Dhaka. On 22 July 2021, the dates for the matches were confirmed. The series was not shown live in Australia due to a lack of a deal with broadcasters. It was the first time since the team's tour of Pakistan in 1994 that an overseas tour was not shown on Australian television.

Squads

On 27 May 2021, Australia named a 23-man preliminary squad for the tour with Aaron Finch being named as their captain. On 8 June 2021, six more players were added to Australia's preliminary squad, with Australia confirming the final squad on 16 June 2021. Tanveer Sangha and Nathan Ellis were named as reserve players. Ellis was later moved up to Australia's full squad, covering for Riley Meredith. On 25 July 2021, Australia's captain Aaron Finch was ruled out of the tour due to an injury. The next day, Litton Das was ruled out of Bangladesh's squad due to a family matter. On 2 August 2021, Cricket Australia named Matthew Wade as the team captain in Finch's absence.

T20I series

1st T20I

2nd T20I

3rd T20I

4th T20I

5th T20I

References

External links
 Series home at ESPN Cricinfo

2021 in Bangladeshi cricket
2021 in Australian cricket
International cricket competitions in 2021
Australian cricket tours of Bangladesh